Pseudophilautus sordidus, commonly known as the grubby shrub frog is a species of frog in the family Rhacophoridae.

It is endemic to Sri Lanka.

Its natural habitats are subtropical or tropical moist lowland forests, subtropical or tropical moist montane forests, rivers, plantations, rural gardens, and heavily degraded former forest.
It is becoming rarer due to habitat loss.

References

sordidus
Endemic fauna of Sri Lanka
Frogs of Sri Lanka
Taxa named by Rohan Pethiyagoda
Amphibians described in 2005
Taxonomy articles created by Polbot